Hancock North Central High School was a high school in Kiln, Mississippi. The school first opened on August 28, 1959. The school's athletic teams were called the Hawks. Its most famous alumnus, NFL quarterback Brett Favre, played baseball and football at Hancock North Central, earning five varsity letters. The school is also the alma mater of former American Basketball Association standout Wendell Ladner. After a new high school was built, Hancock North Central High School became an elementary school.

Schools in Hancock County, Mississippi
Defunct schools in Mississippi